Sony offers a number of interchangeable-lens cameras in its α (Alpha) line. The line has featured cameras employing three different imaging technologies and two mounts:

 Digital single-lens reflex cameras (DSLR) – early α models with three-digit model numbers employ this technology; they all feature Sony's A-mount.
 SLT (defined by Sony as "single-lens translucent") – similar in appearance to a DSLR, but featuring a fixed semi-reflective mirror. All cameras employing this technology have had two-digit model numbers, with model designations of the form "SLT-A##" or "ILCA-##". Like DSLRs, they all feature Sony's A-mount.
 Mirrorless interchangeable-lens cameras – these cameras have no mirror between the lens and sensor. All NEX and ILCE models use this technology and feature Sony's E-mount. (In addition to these cameras, Sony also offers E-mount cameras, which are not part of the α line, but the Handycam, NXCAM and XDCAM systems.)
 Sony ILCE camera – Interchangeable Lens Camera with E-mount
 Sony ILCA camera – Interchangeable Lens Camera with A-mount

List of Sony A-mount cameras

List of Sony α system E-mount cameras

See also
 List of Sony E-mount lenses
 List of Sony A-mount lenses

References